Deborah Vivien Cavendish, Duchess of Devonshire,  (born Deborah Vivien Freeman-Mitford and latterly Deborah, Dowager Duchess of Devonshire; 31 March 1920 – 24 September 2014) was an English aristocrat, writer, memoirist, and socialite. She was the youngest and last-surviving of the six Mitford sisters, who were prominent members of British society in the 1930s and 1940s.

Life
Known to her family as "Debo", Deborah Mitford was born in Asthall Manor, Oxfordshire, England. Her parents were David Freeman-Mitford, 2nd Baron Redesdale (1878–1958), son of Algernon Freeman-Mitford, 1st Baron Redesdale, and his wife, Sydney (1880–1963), daughter of Thomas Gibson Bowles, MP. She married Lord Andrew Cavendish, younger son of the 10th Duke of Devonshire, in 1941. When Cavendish's older brother, William, Marquess of Hartington, was killed in action in 1944, Cavendish became heir to the dukedom and began to use the courtesy title Marquess of Hartington.  In 1950, on the death of his father, the Marquess of Hartington became the 11th Duke of Devonshire.

The Duchess was the main public face of Chatsworth for many decades. She wrote several books about Chatsworth, and played a key role in the restoration of the house, the enhancement of the garden and the development of commercial activities such as Chatsworth Farm Shop (which is on a quite different scale from most farm shops, as it employs a hundred people); Chatsworth's other retail and catering operations; and assorted offshoots such as Chatsworth Food (later Chatsworth Estate Trading), which sold luxury foodstuffs carrying her signature; and Chatsworth Design, which sells image rights to items and designs from the Chatsworth collections. Recognising the commercial imperatives of running a stately home, she took a very active role and was known to man the Chatsworth House ticket office herself.  She also supervised the development of the Cavendish Hotel at Baslow, near Chatsworth, and the Devonshire Arms Hotel at Bolton Abbey.

In 1999, the Duchess was appointed a Dame Commander of the Royal Victorian Order (DCVO) by Queen Elizabeth II, for her service to the Royal Collection Trust. Upon the death of her husband in 2004, her son Peregrine Cavendish became the 12th Duke of Devonshire. She became the Dowager Duchess of Devonshire at this time, and moved into a smaller house on the Chatsworth estate.

Children

She and the duke had seven children, four of whom died shortly after birth:
 Mark Cavendish (born and died 14 November 1941)
 Lady Emma Cavendish (born 26 March 1943), married Hon Tobias William Tennant, son of the 2nd Lord Glenconner, in 1963 and has issue.
 Peregrine Andrew Morny Cavendish, 12th Duke of Devonshire (born 27 April 1944)
 An unnamed child (miscarried December 1946; the child was a twin of Victor Cavendish, born in 1947)
 Lord Victor Cavendish (born and died 22 May 1947)
 Lady Mary Cavendish (born and died 5 April 1953)
 Lady Sophia Louise Sydney Cavendish (born 18 March 1957), married, firstly, Anthony William Lindsay Murphy in 1979, divorced 1987. In 1988 she married secondly Alastair Morrison, 3rd Baron Margadale, son of James Morrison, 2nd Baron Margadale, with whom she had two children.  Following divorce she married, thirdly, William Topley in 1999.

Nephew

She was a maternal aunt of Max Mosley, former president of the Fédération Internationale de l'Automobile (FIA), as well as the grandmother of fashion model Stella Tennant (1970–2020).

Politics
In 1981, the Duchess became politically active when she and her husband, Andrew Cavendish, 11th Duke of Devonshire, joined the new Social Democratic Party.

Death
The Duchess died on 24 September 2014, at the age of 94. Her funeral was held on 2 October 2014 at St Peter's Church, Edensor. Guests included The Prince of Wales and The Duchess of Cornwall.

At the time of her death, journalist Michael Crick speculated that she was the last living Briton who had met Adolf Hitler.

Titles
 1920–1941 – The Honourable Deborah Freeman-Mitford
 1941–1944 – Lady Andrew Cavendish
 1944–1950 – Marchioness of Hartington
 1950–1999 – Her Grace The Duchess of Devonshire
 1999–2004 – Her Grace The Duchess of Devonshire, DCVO
 2004–2014 – Her Grace The Dowager Duchess of Devonshire, DCVO

Selected interviews
Cavendish was interviewed on her experience of sitting for a portrait for painter Lucian Freud in the BBC series Imagine in 2004.

In an interview with John Preston of The Daily Telegraph, published in September 2007, she recounted having tea with Adolf Hitler during a visit to Munich in June 1937, when she was visiting Germany with her mother and her sister Unity, the latter being the only one of the three who spoke German and, therefore the one who carried on the entire conversation with Hitler. Shortly before ending the interview, Preston asked her to choose with whom she would have preferred to have tea: American singer Elvis Presley or Hitler. Looking at the interviewer with astonishment, she answered: "Well, Elvis of course! What an extraordinary question."

In 2010, the BBC journalist Kirsty Wark interviewed the Duchess for Newsnight. In it, the Duchess talked about life in the 1930s and 1940s, Hitler, the Chatsworth estate, and the marginalisation of the upper classes. She was also interviewed on 23 December by Charlie Rose for PBS.

On 10 November 2010, she was interviewed as part of "The Artists, Poets, and Writers Lecture Series" sponsored by the Frick Collection, an interview which focused on her memoir and her published correspondence with Patrick Leigh Fermor.

Ancestry

Publications

Books
Chatsworth: The House (1980; revised edition 2002)
The Estate: A View from Chatsworth (1990)
The Farmyard at Chatsworth (1991) – for children
Treasures of Chatsworth: A Private View (1991)
The Garden at Chatsworth (1999) 
Counting My Chickens and Other Home Thoughts (2002) – essays
The Chatsworth Cookery Book (2003)
Round About Chatsworth (2005)
Memories of Andrew Devonshire (2007)
The Mitfords: Letters Between Six Sisters (2007), edited by Charlotte Mosley, 
In Tearing Haste: Letters Between Deborah Devonshire and Patrick Leigh Fermor (2008), edited by Charlotte Mosley
Home to Roost . . . and Other Peckings (2009)
Wait for Me!... Memoirs of the Youngest Mitford Sister (2010)
All in One Basket (2011)
Mitford, Diana, The Pursuit of Laughter (2008) – introduction

Magazines
 The Spectator

Bibliography

Documentary
 Chatsworth (TV series)

References

External links
Deborah Mitford: Beauty Icon on style.com; accessed 28 September 2014.

1920 births
2014 deaths
20th-century English writers
21st-century English memoirists
20th-century English women writers
21st-century English women writers
21st-century essayists
English duchesses by marriage
Cavendish family
British debutantes
British cookbook writers
Daughters of barons
English socialites
English non-fiction writers
Dames Commander of the Royal Victorian Order
Mitford family
People from Derbyshire Dales (district)
Women cookbook writers
People from West Oxfordshire District
British women memoirists
Wives of knights
Social Democratic Party (UK) people